Fred Alexander Barkley (1908–1989) was an American botanist.
Barkley studied at the University of Oklahoma and was awarded a PhD from the Washington University in St. Louis in 1937.

References

1908 births
1989 deaths
20th-century American botanists
University of Oklahoma alumni
Washington University in St. Louis alumni